Dragan Apić (born 3 October 1995) is a Serbian professional basketball player for Nizhny Novgorod of the VTB United League.

Playing career
In March 2015, Apić signed for Crvena zvezda Telekom and was immediately loaned to FMP, just before the start of the Serbian Super League season, after spending inaugural years of his career in Vršac. On 13 September 2017, Apić signed a four-year contract for Crvena zvezda. On 14 December 2017, he was loaded out to FMP for the rest of the 2017–18 season. In the 2018–19 season, Apić was named Adriatic League Player of the Month for November and December.

On 19 January 2019, Apić signed a four-year contract with the Russian club Lokomotiv Kuban. In January 2020, he was loaned to San Pablo Burgos of the Spanish Liga ACB for the rest of the 2019–20 season.

On 4 July 2020, Apić signed a two-year contract with the Bosnian team Igokea. Ten days later, however, he parted ways with Igokea and signed a two-year contract with the Montenegrin team Budućnost VOLI. On 12 July 2021, he has signed with Stelmet Zielona Góra of the PLK.

On July 7, 2022, he signed with Nizhny Novgorod of the VTB United League.

Career statistics

Euroleague

|-
| style="text-align:left;"| 2017–18
| style="text-align:left;"| Crvena zvezda
| 3 || 0 || 5.6 || 1.000 || .000 || .000 || .0 || .0 || .0 || .0 || 1.3 || -.7
|- class="sortbottom"
| align="center" colspan="2"| Career
| 3 || 0 || 5.6 || 1.000 || .000 || .000 || .0 || .0 || .0 || .0 || 1.3 || -.7

References

External links
 Dragan Apić at aba-liga.com
 Dragan Apić at draftexpress.com
 Dragan Apić at eurobasket.com
 Dragan Apić at fiba.com

1995 births
Living people
ABA League players
Basket Zielona Góra players
Basketball League of Serbia players
Basketball players from Novi Sad
BC Nizhny Novgorod players
CB Miraflores players
KK Budućnost players
KK Crvena zvezda players
KK FMP players
KK Vršac players
PBC Lokomotiv-Kuban players
Power forwards (basketball)
Serbian expatriate basketball people in Montenegro
Serbian expatriate basketball people in Poland
Serbian expatriate basketball people in Russia
Serbian expatriate basketball people in Spain
Serbian men's basketball players